Baranauskas is a crater on Mercury. Its name was adopted by the International Astronomical Union (IAU) on September 25, 2015. Baranauskas is named for the Lithuanian poet Antanas Baranauskas.

The floor and walls of the crater have hollows, which appear bright when the sun is high in the sky.

Views

References

Impact craters on Mercury